Tillandsia cochabambae is a species in the genus Tillandsia. This species is endemic to Bolivia.

References

cochabambae
Flora of Bolivia